Brigadier Herbert Hambleton CBE (25 April 1896 – 1 January 1985) was an English soldier who served in World War I  and World War II.

Hambleton was also a cricketer, golfer, and footballer. He was part of Great Britain's squad for the football tournament at the 1920 Summer Olympics, but he did not play in any matches. 

Hambleton was awarded with an Officer of the Order of the British Empire (OBE) in the 1919 Birthday Honours. He was made a Commander of the Order of the British Empire in 1945. Hambleton also served as aide-de-camp to Sir Tom Bridges when he was Governor of South Australia.

References

External links

Generals of World War II

1896 births
1985 deaths
English footballers
Place of birth missing
Olympic footballers of Great Britain
Footballers at the 1920 Summer Olympics
Association football forwards
British Army brigadiers
Commanders of the Order of the British Empire
British Army personnel of World War I
British Army personnel of World War II